Poissy is a commune in the Yvelines department in the Île-de-France region in north-central France. It is located in the western suburbs of Paris,  from the centre of Paris. Inhabitants are called Pisciacais in French.

Poissy is one of the oldest royal cities of Île-de-France, birthplace of Louis IX of France and Philip III of France, before being supplanted from the 15th century by Saint-Germain-en-Laye.

In 1561 it was the site of a fruitless Catholic-Huguenot conference, the Colloquy of Poissy. It is known for hosting the Automobiles Gregoire successively, Matford, Ford SAF, Simca, Chrysler, Talbot factories and now hosts one of France's largest Peugeot factories. The "Simca Poissy engine" was made here.

Poissy is the 165th most populated city in Metropolitan France.

Location

Poissy is located about 30 kilometers west of Paris, in the northeastern part of the Yvelines, 8 kilometers west of Saint-Germain-en-Laye, and 23 kilometers northwest of Versailles, the departmental prefecture.

The city is limited to the east by the forest of Saint-Germain-en-Laye and to the west by the Seine.

Population

Transport
Poissy is served by Poissy station on Paris RER line A and on the Transilien Paris-Saint-Lazare suburban rail line.

Economy

Main companies

 Automobile:
 PSA Peugeot Citroën
 Wagon Automotive (équipementier automobile)
 Mahle Aftermarket
 Faurecia
Siemens VDO Automotive
 Rochas (Procter & Gamble) now Fareva
Environnement SA
 Transport and logistics:
GEFCO
Elidis
KDI Promet
Trapil
Wattelez
Casino cafétéria
Groupe Derichebourg,

Technoparc

Technoparc is a Business Park created in 1990, with the intention to facilitate the economic diversification of the city. It occupies about 66 acres on the northeast of PSA Peugeot Citroën factory, bordering the neighbouring commune Achères. The Park welcomes 150 companies employing a total of 2,000 employees. It also hosts The Charles-de-Gaulle High School and The Training Centre for the Employees in Pharmacy (ACPPAV) gathering 1,500 high school students and students. Two business incubator, a heliport, the Chamber of Commerce of Yvelines-Val d'Oise, two hotels, a sports centre and a municipal technical centre are also located there.

Highlights
 
 Villa Savoye, considered by many to be the seminal work of the Swiss architect Le Corbusier.
 The "Noyau de Poissy" is a liquor based on macerated or distilled apricot pits, a local tradition since early 18th century.

Culture

Museums
  Musée du jouet, shows 800 games and toys dating between 1850 and 1950.
  Musée d'art et d'histoire.

Cultural facilities
 La salle Molière (theater);
 Cinema;
 Library Christine de Pizan;
 Library André-Malraux.

Poissy in film
 La Porteuse de pain (1963) ;
 La Demoiselle d'Avignon (1972) ;
 La Tribu (1990)
 Les Grands Ducs (1996) ;
 Le Ciel, les oiseaux et... ta mère ! (1998) ;
 Le Cerveau ;
 From Paris with Love (2009) ;
 Turk's Head (2010) ;
Serial Teachers (2013) ;
 Le Mystère des jonquilles (2014) ;
 French Blood (2015);
 Dheepan (2015) ;

Education

Poissy has ten public preschools, ten public elementary schools, two junior high schools, two senior high schools, a combined junior-senior high school, along with a private preschool and elementary school.

Public secondary schools:
 Collège les Grands-Champs
 SEGPA les Grands-Champs
 Collège Jean Jaurès
 Lycée Adrienne Bolland
 Lycée Charles de Gaulle
 Collège et Lycée Le Corbusier

Private elementary schools:
 Institution Notre-Dame preschool and elementary school

Hospital 
 Centre hospitalier intercommunal de Poissy-Saint-Germain-en-Laye

International relations

Poissy is twinned with:
 Pirmasens, Rhineland-Palatinate, Germany, since 1964.

People
 Saint Louis (1214–1270), king of France
 Guillaume Lasceux (1740–1831), composer and organist
 Jean-Louis-Ernest Meissonier (1815–1891), painter, sculptor and mayor of Poissy
 Ibrahim Diaw, handball player
 Florent Groberg, U.S. Army Medal of Honor recipient 
 Matteo Guendouzi footballer
 Catherine Lara, singer born in 1945
 Houssine Kharja, Moroccan football player born in 1982
 Benjamin Franklin resided in Poissy for a time while envoy to France during the American Revolutionary War
 Jérôme Phojo, footballer
 Fabien Raddas, footballer
 Yohann Sangare, basketball player
 Christophe Jaffrelot, political scientist and indologist
 Olivier Lombard, racing driver

Sport

 Skatepark
 The golf of Béthemont
 Stadium Léo-Lagrange, built in 1945
 Swimming pool des Migneaux and swimming pool Saint-Exupéry
 AS Poissy

See also
 Communes of the Yvelines department

References

External links

 Poissy website 
 Collegiale de Poissy—the birth city of Saint Louis

 
Communes of Yvelines
Cities in Île-de-France
Yvelines communes articles needing translation from French Wikipedia